The 2022 ICC Awards will be the  eighteenth edition of ICC Awards. The nominations took into account players' performance between 1 January 2022 and 31 December 2022.

Winners and nominees
The shortlists of the nominations for individual award categories were announced from 28 to 30 December 2022.

Men's awards

Women's awards

Other awards

ICC Teams of the Year

Men's teams

 ICC Men's Test Team of the Year

 ICC Men's ODI Team of the Year

 ICC Men's T20I Team of the Year

Women's teams

 ICC Women's ODI Team of the Year

 ICC Women's T20I Team of the Year

References

International Cricket Council awards and rankings
Cricket
ICC Awards